Evalina Orellana, screen name Julia Evelina Macías Lopera (b. 26 April 1908 – d. 21 October 1986), was the first Ecuadorian actress in silent film .

Biography
Evalina Orellana was born on 26 April 1908 in Balzar, but grew up in Guayaquil and worked at the La Previsora bank and the Ritz and Tívoli hotels. In 1922, she began taking class in acting in the studio of Italian Carlos Bocaccio, who maintained a school in the city at the Frontón Betty Jai. In 1924, she starred in the first Ecuadorian silent film, as its protagonist, Rachel.

In 1925, Orellana appeared in the film Soledad, filmed at the Angelica Hacienda and directed by Félix González Rubio, written by Rodrigo de Triana (who also appeared in the film), and produced by the Guayaquil Films Company. The final film that Orellana played in was the 1930 film Guayaquil de mis amores, produced by the  company. From this point on, she would only appear in plays.

Citations

1908 births
1986 deaths
Ecuadorian film actresses
Ecuadorian stage actresses